Senna notabilis is a species of flowering plant in the legume family Fabaceae, and the subfamily Caesalpinioideae native to Australia, first described in 1862 by Ferdinand von Mueller as Cassia notabilis. It was transferred to the genus, Senna in 1990 by Barbara Rae Randell.

It occurs in all mainland states and territories except Victoria, in numerous habitats including rocky hillsides, clays and deep desert sands, and is often found with Triodia species.

Gallery

References

External links 
Senna notabilis occurrence data from GBIF

notabilis
Flora of Australia
Taxa named by Ferdinand von Mueller
Plants described in 1862